Michael David Heideman (March 29, 1948 – June 30, 2018) was an American athletic coach, at Xavier High School in Appleton, Wisconsin, and head men's basketball coach for the University of Wisconsin–Green Bay.

Heideman was born in Appleton, Wisconsin and graduated from Xavier High School, in Appleton, in 1966. He received his bachelor's and master's degree from University of Wisconsin–La Crosse. Heideman died from cancer in Green Bay, Wisconsin.

References

1948 births
2018 deaths
American men's basketball coaches
American men's basketball players
Basketball coaches from Wisconsin
Basketball players from Wisconsin
Deaths from cancer in Wisconsin
Green Bay Phoenix men's basketball coaches
High school basketball coaches in Wisconsin
High school football coaches in Wisconsin
Sportspeople from Appleton, Wisconsin
Valparaiso Beacons men's basketball coaches
Washington State Cougars men's basketball coaches
Wisconsin–La Crosse Eagles men's basketball players
Xavier High School (Appleton, Wisconsin) alumni